MINAS is a database of metal ions in nucleic acids.

References

External links
 http://www.minas.uzh.ch

Biological databases
Biochemistry
Inorganic chemistry